Morgan Andersen (born 7 April 1966) is a retired Norwegian ice hockey player.

He hails from Yven in Tune. During his active ice hockey career he played for Stjernen, Mora IK and Lillehammer IK. He last played for Stjernen in 1998. He played for the Norwegian national ice hockey team at the 1988, 1992 and 1994 Winter Olympics.

After retiring he has worked as a sports official and coach. He is a former sports director for the football club FK Lyn, and was involved in the transfer controversies around player Mikel John Obi. He has also led the trade union for Norwegian sportspeople, the Norwegian Players' Association, and after his period in Lyn he became sports manager and assistant coach for Stjernen Hockey. In 2009, he was promoted to head coach.

He was arrested by police in December 2011, suspected of participating in tax fraud during payments of football player Raio Piiroja.

References

External links
"Etterlot seg et konkurstruet NISO"

Norwegian prisoners and detainees
1966 births
Living people
People from Sarpsborg
Norwegian ice hockey players
Stjernen Hockey players
Lillehammer IK players
Mora IK players
Norwegian expatriate ice hockey people
Norwegian expatriate sportspeople in Sweden
Olympic ice hockey players of Norway
Ice hockey players at the 1988 Winter Olympics
Ice hockey players at the 1992 Winter Olympics
Ice hockey players at the 1994 Winter Olympics
Norwegian trade unionists
Norwegian sports executives and administrators
Norwegian ice hockey coaches
Fredrikstad FK non-playing staff